The Antenor Navarro Formation is an Early Cretaceous geologic formation in Brazil. Fossil sauropod tracks have been reported from the formation.

Etymology 
, for whom the formation was named, had been a major leader of the Brazilian Revolution of 1930, which brought Getulio Vargas to power. He was killed in a plane crash in 1932, at the age of 34, and his name commemorated also in hundreds of street names and public institutions in Brazilian cities.

Fossil content 
Among others the following fossils have been found in the formation:

 Caririchnium magnificum
 Staurichnium diogenis
 Carnosauria indet.
 Nodosauridae indet.
 Sauropoda indet.

See also 
 List of dinosaur-bearing rock formations
 List of stratigraphic units with sauropodomorph tracks
 Sauropod tracks

References

Bibliography

Further reading 
 G. Leonardi and M. F. C. Dos Santos. 2006. New dinosaur tracksites from the Sousa Lower Cretaceous Basin (Paraíba, Brasil). Studi Trentini di Scienze Naturali, Acta Geologica 81:5-21

Geologic formations of Brazil
Lower Cretaceous Series of South America
Cretaceous Brazil
Barremian Stage
Berriasian Stage
Hauterivian Stage
Valanginian Stage
Sandstone formations
Siltstone formations
Conglomerate formations
Alluvial deposits
Fluvial deposits
Lacustrine deposits
Ichnofossiliferous formations
Fossiliferous stratigraphic units of South America
Paleontology in Brazil
Formations